Pearl Days is the fifth studio-album by Italian singer Elisa. The album was released on 15 October 2004 and debuted at number two on the Italian album chart.
Pearl Days is a rock album that echoes Elisa's debut album Pipes & Flowers.
The album went double platinum in Italy.

The first single from the album was the promotional single "Together", followed by the promotional single "The Waves".
The latest single was the hit "Una poesia anche per te (Life Goes On)". This song debuted at number seven in the Italian Singles Chart and arrived soon at the first position, becoming the most-selling Italian single of 2005 by a female artist.

Track listing 
All lyrics written by Elisa; all music composed by Elisa except where noted.

Track listing (re-issue)

Chart performance

References

2007 albums
Elisa (Italian singer) albums
Albums produced by Glen Ballard